Brazzein is a sweet-tasting protein extracted from the West African fruit of the climbing plant Oubli (Pentadiplandra brazzeana Baillon). It was first isolated by the University of Wisconsin–Madison in 1994.

Brazzein is found in the extracellular region, in the pulp tissue surrounding the seeds. With pentadin, discovered in 1989, brazzein is the second sweet-tasting protein discovered in the Oubli fruit.

Like the other sweet proteins discovered in plants, such as monellin and thaumatin, it is extremely sweet compared to commonly used sweeteners (500 to 2000 times sweeter than sucrose). The fruit tastes sweet to humans, monkeys, and bonobos, but gorillas have mutations in their sweetness receptors so that they do not find brazzein sweet, and they are not known to eat the fruit.

Traditional use
The Oubli plant (from which the protein was isolated) grows in Gabon and Cameroon, where its fruit has been consumed by the apes and local people for a long time. Due to brazzein and pentadin, the berries of the plant are incredibly sweet. African locals call them "Oubli" (French for "forgot") in their vernacular language because their taste is said to encourage nursing infants to forget their mother's milk, as once they eat them they are said to forget to come back to the village to see their mother.

Protein structure
The monomer protein, consisting of 54 amino acid residues, is the smallest of the sweet proteins with a molecular weight of 6.5 kDa. The amino acid sequence of brazzein, adapted from the Swiss-Prot biological database of protein, is as follows: ''

The structure of brazzein was determined by proton nuclear magnetic resonance (NMR) at a pH of 5.2 and 22 °C.  Brazzein has four evenly spaced disulfide bonds and no sulfhydryl groups.

3D analysis of brazzein showed one alpha-helix and three strands of anti-parallel beta sheet. This is not superficially similar to either of the other two sweet-tasting proteins, monellin and thaumatin.

However, a recent 3D study shows that these three proteins possess similar "sweet fingers" believed to elicit the sweet taste.

Residues 29–33 and 39–43, plus residue 36, as well as the C-terminus were found to be involved in the sweet taste of the protein. The charge of the protein also plays an important role in its interaction with the sweet taste receptor.

Based on this knowledge a synthesised improved brazzein, called pGlu-1-brazzein, was reported to be twice as sweet as the natural counterpart.

Sweetness properties
On a weight basis, brazzein is 500 to 2000 times sweeter than sucrose, compared to 10% sucrose and 2% sucrose solution respectively.

Its sweet perception is more similar to sucrose than that of thaumatin, with a clean sweet taste, lingering aftertaste, and slight delay (longer than aspartame) in an equi-sweet solution.

Brazzein is stable over a broad pH range from 2.5 to 8 and heat stable at 98°C for 2 hours.

As a sweetener
Brazzein represents an alternative to available low-calorie sweeteners. As a protein, it is safe for diabetics. It is also very soluble in water (>50 mg/mL).

When blended with other sweeteners, such as aspartame and stevia, brazzein reduces side aftertaste and complements their flavor.

Its taste profile is closer to sucrose than other natural sweeteners (apart from thaumatin). Unlike other sweet-tasting proteins, it can withstand heat, making it more suitable for industrial food processing.

Papers have been published showing it can be made in a laboratory using peptide synthesis and recombinant proteins were successfully produced via E. coli.

The Texas companies Prodigene and Nectar Worldwide were among the licensees to use Wisconsin Alumni Research Foundation patents on brazzein, and genetically engineer it into maize. Brazzein then can be commercially extracted from the maize through ordinary milling. Approximately one ton of maize yields 1-2 kilograms of brazzein. It can also be engineered into plants like wheat to make pre-sweetened grains, e.g. for cereals.

A company was formed to bring it to market as a sweetener in 2008, which initially said it would start selling the product by 2010 once it obtained agreement from the FDA that its brazzein was generally recognized as safe (GRAS). In 2012 the company said that regulatory approval might take an additional one or two years and in 2014 it still had not obtained a GRAS waiver from the FDA and was seeking partners, and the product was still not on the market as of 2016.

See also 
 Curculin
 Mabinlin
 Miraculin
 Monellin
 Thaumatin

References

External links

Sugar substitutes
Plant proteins